Ismat Abasov Dursun oglu (born 25 May 1954) is an Azerbaijani politician who has served as Deputy Prime Minister of Azerbaijan since 2013.

Previously Abasov was First Deputy Minister of Agriculture from October 1997 to October 2004 and Minister of Agriculture from October 2004 to October 2013.

Early life and political career
Abasov was born and raised in Yerevan, Armenia, and is fluent in Armenian. He moved to Baku, Azerbaijan to study at the Azerbaijan State Economic University.

Abbasov was appointed as Minister of Agriculture in 2004 and re-appointed as minister on 31 October 2008 in a government reshuffle.

Abasov also served as President of the Table Tennis Federation of Azerbaijan from December 2004 to February 2014.

Awards
Abasov was awarded with the Medal of Honour (Shohret) for his contribution to the development of the agrarian sector of Azerbaijan on 23 May 2014.

See also

Cabinet of Azerbaijan
Politics of Azerbaijan

References

1954 births
Living people
Armenian Azerbaijanis
Politicians from Yerevan
Politicians from Baku
Government ministers of Azerbaijan
Azerbaijan State University of Economics alumni